Piraí do Sul is a  municipality in the state of Paraná in the Southern Region of Brazil.

The agriculture, production and industrialization of wood are the main sources of economy of Piraí do Sul with high industrial rate: 177 companies operate in town. Agrocultural production is also an important sector, especially the harvest of corn, soybeans and wheat. By the end of 2012, total consumption of is 23700 inhabitants should reach BRL 260 million, being the 84th in the state ranking. Piraí do Sul also has tourism potential, especially religious one the city is the fourth destination in the most sought religious tourism in Brasil thanks to the Shrine of Our Lady of the sprout, the patron saint of Drovers Route.

See also
List of municipalities in Paraná
Parish Church of Piraí do Sul

References

Municipalities in Paraná